Ob' Passage is a passage 0.4 nautical miles (0.7 km) wide between Khmary Island and Mabus Point on the coast of Antarctica. First observed by the Australasian Antarctic Expedition (1911–14) under Douglas Mawson. Mapped by the Soviet expedition (1956), who named it for the ship Ob'.

References

Straits of Antarctica
Bodies of water of Queen Mary Land